Scorcher is a futuristic racing video game by Danish developer Zyrinx, released in 1996 for the PC and in 1997 for the Sega Saturn. Originally announced under the name "Vertigo", the game focuses on special motorcycles that reach up to 450 km/h racing through dangerous tracks in a dystopian year 2021.

Scorcher was one of the most graphically advanced Sega Saturn games of its time, enough so that Sega shipped an unfinished version of the game to third-party developers as a graphics demo for the Saturn.

Reception

Though the Saturn version of Scorcher was hyped in the press during its development, the completed game underwhelmed most critics upon release. Reviews typically commented that despite its prolonged development cycle, Scorchers graphics were still cutting edge, but that the gameplay design is flawed and overall mediocre. Lee Nutter of Sega Saturn Magazine, for example, called it "A graphically excellent racing title where the gameplay appears to have been more of an afterthought than an integral part of the game.", and Next Generation summarized that "Scorcher is a good game, with many things going for it, but Scavenger's preoccupation with making it look cool rather than play great make it a sad epitaph for the once-promising company."

Most critics complained at the lack of a multiplayer mode, but they otherwise varied in what exactly held back Scorchers gameplay. GamePro found the controls, particularly the use of separate buttons to execute hard turns, were too difficult. Jeff Gerstmann, writing for GameSpot, said that it was simply too generic, while James Price of Saturn Power cited a lack of variety in the tracks. Lee Nutter agreed on this point, and additionally felt the concept of an obstacle-laden, platformer-influenced racing track was fundamentally flawed. He also criticized that "there are only three other competitors". Sushi-X of Electronic Gaming Monthly felt these competitors offered no challenge, and the track obstacles suffer from poor collision detection. His three co-reviewers defended the game, saying that it seems awful at first but is enjoyable once one masters the difficult controls. They gave it scores of 7.0 and 7.5 out of 10, while Sushi-X gave it a 3.0/10. Next Generation contended that few gamers would be willing to work their way over this frustrating learning curve, particularly complaining at the steep increase in difficulty on the third track and the fact that players who fall down a pit are respawned right in front of the same pit. In Japan, where the Saturn version was ported and published by Acclaim Japan on August 22, 1997, Famitsu gave it a score of 21 out of 40.

Notes

References

External links
 

1996 video games
DOS games
Science fiction racing games
Sega Saturn games
Video games scored by Jesper Kyd
Video games developed in Denmark
Video games set in 2021
Windows games
Single-player video games